The Gulf Oil Company Service Station is a former automotive service station at Main and South Third Streets in Paragould, Arkansas.  Built in 1926, it is a single-story brick building, with a canopied area similar to a porte-cochere supported by brick columns.  The building has stylistic elements giving it a vague Mediterranean appearance, including an entablature with egg-and-dart molding beneath a metal cornice and parapet.  It is divided functionally into four rooms: an office, two restrooms, and a tool storage area.  The building was used as a service station until 1969.

The building was listed on the National Register of Historic Places in 1994, at which time it was vacant; its owner since the 1940s refused offers to repurpose the building, preferring to keep it in pristine condition.

See also
National Register of Historic Places listings in Greene County, Arkansas

References

Gas stations on the National Register of Historic Places in Arkansas
Mission Revival architecture in Arkansas
Buildings and structures completed in 1926
Buildings and structures in Paragould, Arkansas
National Register of Historic Places in Greene County, Arkansas
Gulf Oil